The expansion draft for the construction of the Charlotte Bobcats, recognized at the time as the 30th NBA franchise, was held on June 22, 2004. The Bobcats selected 19 players from other teams' unprotected players lists and constructed their squad for what was regarded at the time as their inaugural season.

This was the second time an expansion draft was held for the Charlotte NBA franchise, known since the 2014–15 season as the Hornets. The original team relocated to New Orleans prior to the 2002–03 season, retaining the Hornets name until , when it was renamed the New Orleans Pelicans. The Charlotte franchise was suspended for two seasons, before an expansion team known as the Bobcats was established in 2004. It was renamed the Hornets prior to the 2014–15 season after the Pelicans relinquished the rights to the Hornets name.

Key

Selections

Notes
 In 2014, the Hornets reacquired the history and records of the original Hornets from 1988–2002 as part of an agreement with the NBA and the Pelicans. The records from 2002–13 remained with the Pelicans franchise.
According to the expansion draft rules, a restricted free agent who was selected in the expansion draft would become an unrestricted free agent on July 1, 2004.
 Number of years played in the NBA prior to the draft
 Career with the expansion franchise that drafted the player
 Never played a game for the franchise
 J. R. Bremer was born in the United States, but became a naturalized Bosnia and Herzegovina citizen. He has represented Bosnia and Herzegovina national team.
 Predrag Drobnjak previously played for the Serbia and Montenegro national team, but has represented the Montenegro national team after Serbia and Montenegro dissolved in June 2006 into two independent countries.
 Aleksandar Pavlović previously played for the Serbia and Montenegro national team, but has represented the Serbia national team after Serbia and Montenegro dissolved in June 2006 into two independent countries.

Trades

Pre-draft trades
Prior to the day of the draft, the following trades were made and resulted in exchanges of future draft picks between the teams, along with a particular agreement in the expansion draft.
 The Charlotte Bobcats acquired the second pick in the 2004 Draft and  agreed to select Predrag Drobnjak in the expansion draft from the Los Angeles Clippers in exchange for the fourth and 33rd picks in the 2004 Draft.
 The Charlotte Bobcats agreed to select Jahidi White from the Phoenix Suns in exchange for a future first-round pick and cash considerations.

Draft-day trades
The following trades involving drafted players were made on the day of the draft.
 The Charlotte Bobcats traded Aleksandar Pavlović to the Cleveland Cavaliers in exchange for a lottery-protected first-round pick. This pick was ultimately executed as the #22 pick in the 2007 draft, with which the Bobcats selected Jared Dudley.
 The Charlotte Bobcats traded Zaza Pachulia to the Milwaukee Bucks in exchange for the 45th pick in the 2004 Draft.

References
General

Specific

External links
NBA.com
NBA.com: NBA Draft History
Charlotte Bobcats: Draft Central 2004

Expansion
Charlotte Hornets lists
National Basketball Association expansion draft
National Basketball Association lists
NBA expansion draft